Rapel River is a river of Chile located in the O'Higgins Region. It begins at the confluence of the rivers Cachapoal and Tinguiririca in an area best known as La Junta. At present day, this area is impounded by Rapel Dam, creating Rapel Lake.

Other tributaries:
 Estero Alhué
 Claro de Rengo River(Cachapoal)
 Claro River(Tinguiririca)
 Estero Zamorano
 Estero La Cadena
 Estero Carén
 Estero Coya
 Estero Chimbarongo
 Pangal River

See also
List of rivers of Chile

References

External links 
  Rapel River Map

Rivers of O'Higgins Region
Rivers of Chile